Taree railway station is located on the North Coast line in New South Wales, Australia. It serves the town of Taree, opening on 5 February 1913 when the line was extended from Dungog. It was the terminus of the line until it was extended to Wauchope on 12 April 1915. It had extensive locomotive servicing facilities, including an eight road roundhouse. It was added to the New South Wales State Heritage Register on 2 April 1999.

Platforms & services
Taree has one platform with a yard opposite. Daily northbound XPT services operate to Grafton, Casino and Brisbane, with three southbound services operating to Sydney. It is also served by daily coach services to Broadmeadow. These coach services are operated by Busways as routes 150 and 151.

Description 

The main station building is a brick, type 11 initial side building design completed in 1913, with a refreshment room added in 1929. A weighbridge and goods shed also form part of the station complex.

Heritage listing 

Taree is a major station complex from late in the development of the railway system and includes a refreshment room and awnings. The scale of the building is significant and represents the importance of the location in the development of the North Coast line.

Taree railway station was listed on the New South Wales State Heritage Register on 2 April 1999 having satisfied the following criteria.

The place possesses uncommon, rare or endangered aspects of the cultural or natural history of New South Wales.

This item is assessed as historically rare. This item is assessed as architecturally rare. This item is assessed as socially rare.

References

Attribution

External links

Taree station details Transport for New South Wales

Easy Access railway stations in New South Wales
Railway stations in Australia opened in 1913
Regional railway stations in New South Wales
Taree
New South Wales State Heritage Register
North Coast railway line, New South Wales